Dmitri Igorevich Kayumov (born 11 May 1992) is a Russian professional footballer.

Club career
He made his professional debut in the Russian Premier League on 23 October 2011 for FC Spartak Moscow in a game against FC Tom Tomsk and scored a goal on his debut.

References

External links
 

1992 births
People from Reutov
Living people
Russian footballers
Russia youth international footballers
Russia under-21 international footballers
Association football midfielders
Russian Premier League players
FC Spartak Moscow players
FC Amkar Perm players
FC Fakel Voronezh players
FC Armavir players
FC Tambov players
FC Avangard Kursk players
FC SKA Rostov-on-Don players
FC Tom Tomsk players
FC Urozhay Krasnodar players
FC Spartak-2 Moscow players
Sportspeople from Moscow Oblast